Buduran Station (BDR) was a railway station located in Buduran, Buduran, Sidoarjo Regency. The station was included in the Operation Area VIII Surabaya. Previously, the station only served the Surabaya–Bangil Commuter service.

About 750 meters to the north of the station there is a museum, namely Mpu Tantular Museum.

History

During the Dutch East Indies era, Staatsspoorwegen once established the status of a railway station in Buduran as a halt, equivalent to a class III or small station, equipped with buildings like other small stations, which were later inactivated. The original station building may have been torn down a long time ago.

On 9 February 2004, along with the launch of the Delta Express, the President Megawati Soekarnoputri was inaugurated the newly rebuilt station building. However, on 10 February 2021, the passenger service at this station was discontinued so that now not a single commuter train service stops at this station.

Services
Starting 10 February 2021 there will be no more passenger services at this station.

References

External links
 

Sidoarjo Regency
Railway stations in East Java
Railway stations opened in 1878
Railway stations closed in 2021
defunct railway stations in Indonesia
1870 establishments in the Dutch East Indies
2021 disestablishments in Indonesia